The Ireland national rugby union team toured of Australia in May and June 1994. It was their second tour of Australia, having previously visited in 1979. Both Jonny Bell and Keith Wood made their senior international debuts in the first test.

Non-international games
Scores and results list Ireland's points tally first.

Test matches

Touring party

Tour manager: F. Sowman
Team manager: Gerry Murphy
Assistant manager: L. Butler
Technical adviser: Willie Anderson
Captain: Michael Bradley

Backs

Forwards

References

Ireland national rugby union team tours of Australia
Ireland tour
Aus
tour